Aptera may refer to:

Biology
 Aptera (cockroach), a genus of cockroaches in the family Blaberidae
 Apteromantis aptera, a species of praying mantis, endemic to the Iberian Peninsula
 Hopea aptera, a species of plant in the family Dipterocarpaceae, endemic to Papua New Guinea
 Inga aptera, a species of legume in the family Fabaceae, found only in Brazil
 Parashorea aptera, a species of plant in the family Dipterocarpaceae, endemic to Indonesia

Other uses
 Aptera (Greece), the city in Crete
 Aptera (Lycia), an ancient city in Lycia, now Turkey
 Aptera Motors, an American high-efficiency vehicle company
 Aptera 2 Series, a series of three wheelers from Aptera Motors announced in 2008
 Aptera (solar electric vehicle), a solar powered three wheeler from Aptera Motors announced in 2019

See also
 Aptera in the 10th edition of Systema Naturae
 Apterygota, a subclass of small, wingless insects